Cursorius  is a genus of coursers,  a group of wading birds. The genus name derive from Latin cursor meaning "runner".

There are five species which breed in Africa and South Asia.
They have long legs, short wings and long pointed bills which curve downwards. Although classed as waders, they inhabit deserts and similar arid regions.
Like the pratincoles, the coursers are found in warmer parts of the Old World. They hunt insects by sight, pursuing them on foot.

Their 2–3 eggs are laid on the ground.

Taxonomy
The genus Cursorius was introduced in 1790 by the English ornithologist John Latham. The type species was subsequently designated as the cream-colored courser.  The genus name is derive from Latin cursor meaning "runner", from currere, "to run".

The genus contains five species:
Cream-colored courser (Cursorius cursor)
Somali courser (Cursorius somalensis)
Burchell's courser (Cursorius rufus)
Temminck's courser (Cursorius temminckii)
Indian courser (Cursorius coromandelicus)

References

 
Bird genera